Xplor may refer to:
 Xplor International, an organization to facilitate the use of electronic documents
 X-PLOR and XPLOR-NIH, protein NMR software
 Xplor, a bi-monthly publication by the Missouri Department of Conservation